Piezosecus tymaiuba is a species of beetle in the family Cerambycidae, the only species in the genus Piezosecus.

References

Piezocerini
Monotypic beetle genera